is a railway station in the town of Tateyama, Toyama, Japan, operated by the private railway operator Toyama Chihō Railway.

Lines

Station layout 
The station has one ground-level side platform serving a single bi-directional track. The station is unattended.

History
Sawanakayama Station was opened on 19 March 1921.

Adjacent stations

Surrounding area 
The station is located in a rural area with only a few scattered farmhouses nearby.

See also
 List of railway stations in Japan

External links

 

Railway stations in Toyama Prefecture
Railway stations in Japan opened in 1921
Stations of Toyama Chihō Railway
Tateyama, Toyama